Hummersknott Academy is a secondary school in Darlington in the north east of England. It schools approximately 1,250 pupils aged eleven to sixteen.

It has had specialist Language College status since 2005 and holds accreditations for Artsmark Silver, Eco-schools Silver, the Royal Society for the Prevention of Accidents silver award for Health and Safety and an International School Award.

History
The school began as the Darlington High School for Girls in 1955, a girls' grammar school. It was officially opened by the Duke of Edinburgh on 15 November 1955. In 1968 it was reorganised by the then Darlington County Borough to form one of six 11–16 co-educational comprehensive schools, with the Boys' Grammar School becoming a sixth form college nearer the town centre and near to the College of Technology, now known as QE (Queen Elizabeth).

New build
In July, 2007 a £15 million scheme to demolish and replace some school buildings and renovate others was initiated. The bulk of the funding was provided by national government, with the local council providing £2.7m, and the school £0.7m. Work began on the school building during the summer of 2007, although plans for the new design were drawn up a year earlier. The work was completed in 2010 and the refurbished school was 'reopened' by the Duke of Gloucester in September 2010. The main hall was refurbished and new lighting and stage area was included in the refurbishment.

Academy Trust
The school became a self-governing academy, under the name Hummersknott Academy on 1 July 2011.  It is operated by the Hummersknott Academy Trust, a company limited by guarantee.

On 1 February 2013, the Hummersknott Academy Trust was reconstituted as a multi-academy trust when it took over the newly formed Skerne Park Academy (a converting primary school) in the town.

House and college reform
Originally, when a grammar school for girls, the school had six houses into which all pupils were distributed and these houses competed against each other in sporting and music competitions for the honour of winning the House Shield. The shields of each house can be seen above the doorways on the front of the school building. These houses were: Barrett, Bede, Caedmon, Carroll, St Hild and Wycliffe. The house system was changed in the late 1980s and the school played host to four houses: Dunelm, Edinburgh, Starmer and Trinity.

In July 2006 these were phased out and replaced by a system of colleges.

Colleges
Pupils are divided into five colleges named after a variety of cultural and local aspects of life, across Darlington and the wider north east of England:

Cuthbert (college colour – yellow), was named after St Cuthbert. Cuthbert is the humanities section of the school (Geography, History, RE). 
Ketton (college colour – purple), was named after the Ketton Ox. Ketton does PE and Science.            
Quaker (college colour – green), was named after the Quakers religious group, who were prominent inhabitants of Darlington. Quaker is Languages and Business Studies.             
Stephenson (college colour – red), was named after George Stephenson. Stephenson is the Maths corridor, ICT and DT department.  
Wyvern (college colour – blue), was named after the Wyvern dragon. Wyvern is Music, Drama, English and Art.

Notable alumni
 Jenny Chapman, Darlington MP
 Philippa Langley   – discovered the remains of Richard III in a car park in Leicester in 2012
 James Morrison (footballer)

References

External links
 

1955 establishments in England
Academies in the Borough of Darlington

Secondary schools in the Borough of Darlington
Educational institutions established in 1955
Schools in Darlington